ŽKK Medveščak is a Croatian women's basketball club from Zagreb. It currently plays in First League of Croatia and Adriatic League.

History

Names in history
 1945—194? – Slavija Zagreb
 194?—1949 – Dinamo Zagreb
 1949—195? – Naprijed Zagreb
 195?—19?? – Šalata Zagreb
 19??—1961 – Metalac Zagreb
 1961—currently – Medveščak Zagreb

Honours

Domestic
National Championships – 6

 First League of Croatia:
Winners (6): 2014, 2015, 2016, 2017, 2018, 2019

National Cups – 3

Cup of Croatia:
Winners (5): 2015, 2016, 2017, 2018, 2019
Runners-up (1): 2009

International
International titles – 0

Adriatic League:
Runners-up (1) : 2016

External links
Official website

Medvescak
Medvescak
Medvescak